Léogâne is an arrondissement in the Ouest Department of Haiti. As of 2015, the population was 509,280 inhabitants. Postal codes in the Léogâne Arrondissement start with the number 62.

The arondissement consists of the following communes:
 Léogâne
 Petit-Goâve
 Grand-Goâve

History

2010 7.0 earthquake

On 12 January 2010, a 7.0 magnitude earthquake struck the arrondissement. The city of Léogâne was estimated to be 80–90% destroyed. Petit Goâve was greatly affected by the quake. All public buildings in Grand-Goâve were destroyed.

See also
Trouin

References

Arrondissements of Haiti
Ouest (department)